The London, Brighton and South Coast Railway War Memorial is a war memorial at London Bridge railway station that honours the employees of the London, Brighton & South Coast Railway who fought in World War I and World War II. Originally set in a brick wall, it was unveiled in 1922. It was framed with flat contemporary cladding panels when the station was redeveloped in the 2010s.

This memorial is one of three erected by the London, Brighton & South Coast Railway, with the other two installed at Brighton and London Victoria stations.

See also
Other railway war memorials:
London and North Western Railway War Memorial, Euston station (to the north).
Great Eastern Railway War Memorial, Liverpool Street station (to the north east).
Great Western Railway War Memorial, Paddington station (to the west).
North Eastern Railway War Memorial, York.
Midland Railway War Memorial, Derby.

References

1921 establishments in England
1921 in London
London, Brighton and South Coast Railway
Military memorials in London
World War I memorials in England
World War II memorials in England
History of the London Borough of Southwark
British railway war memorials